Pinto is a 1920 American silent Western comedy film directed by Victor Schertzinger and starring Mabel Normand, Cullen Landis, and Edward Jobson.

Cast
 Mabel Normand as Pinto 
 Cullen Landis as Bob DeWitt 
 Edward Jobson as Looey 
 Edythe Chapman as Mrs. Audry 
 George Nichols as Pop Audrey 
 William Elmer as Lousy 
 Hallam Cooley as Armand Cassel 
 Andrew Arbuckle as Guardian 
 Richard Cummings as Guardian 
 George Kunkel as Guardian 
 John Burton as Guardian 
 Joseph Hazelton as Guardian 
 Manuel R. Ojeda as Mexican
 T.D. Crittenden as Guardian

References

Bibliography
 James Robert Parish & Michael R. Pitts. Film directors: a guide to their American films. Scarecrow Press, 1974.

External links

 
 

1920 films
1920 Western (genre) films
Films directed by Victor Schertzinger
American black-and-white films
Goldwyn Pictures films
Silent American Western (genre) films
1920s English-language films
1920s American films